SAP All-in-One is SAP's business software brand for small and medium-sized enterprises (SMEs). It includes a range of products like SAP Customer Relationship Management, SAP ERP, SAP Product Lifecycle Management, SAP Supply Chain Management, SAP Supplier Relationship Management, SAP Human Resources and SAP Financial Management.

History 
In 1999, SAP responded to the internet and economic changes by launching mysap.com.

Competitors 
SAP All-in-One competes with Microsoft Dynamics (which is replacing Microsoft Business Solutions), Oracle Corporation and Infor Global Solutions on a global level. They also compete with a variety of national packages such as those sold by Sage in many countries around the world.

Recently companies such as NetSuite and Salesforce.com have offered similar functionality in web-based applications.

See also 
 List of ERP vendors
 Comparison of accounting software

External links 
 mySAP All-in-One

ERP software
SAP SE